Pisa armata is a species of crab from the eastern Atlantic Ocean.

Description
Its carapace is roughly triangular, with two prominent rostral spines, which are parallel in males, but divergent in females. The carapace is brown, but is often covered in seaweed, sponges or anemones.

Distribution
Pisa armata is found in the eastern Atlantic Ocean from around the Isle of Man as far south as Angola, as well as in parts of the Mediterranean Sea.

Ecology
Pisa armata is parasitised by a rhizocephalan barnacle. Although initially considered to be the same species that attacks other crabs such as Carcinus maenas, experiments in the 1960s demonstrated that the two were different species, Sacculina carcini on C. maenas, and Sacculina gibbsi on P. armata.

References

External links

Majoidea
Crustaceans described in 1803
Crustaceans of the Atlantic Ocean